Abraham Harry Blank (July 27, 1879 – 1971) was the founder of the Central States Theater Corporation and a major philanthropist in Des Moines, Iowa. The Blank Zoo is named for his family. His son, Myron Blank, took over the theater business and was also a philanthropist.

Blank was born in Galați, Romania, the son of Isadore and Marian (née Greenberg) Blank. The family moved to Council Bluffs, Iowa.

Early in his career, Blank was a balloon and novelty salesman in Omaha, Nebraska. He worked as a barker during the Trans-Mississippi Exposition in 1898.

Blank owned and operated several large theaters, including the Star Theater in Des Moines, the Casino Theater in Davenport, and the Casino Theater in Charles City, Iowa. He also built theaters in Omaha, Cedar Rapids, Newton, and Waterloo.

He was vice-president of the Iowa Picture Convention, held in 1916.

He and his wife established the Raymond Blank Memorial Hospital for Children in 1944 in memory of their son, Raymond. A collection of their family photos are exhibited. Blank met with president Franklin Delano Roosevelt to get construction of the hospital approved during World War II.

References

1879 births
1971 deaths
People from Galați
American people of Romanian-Jewish descent
Romanian emigrants to the United States
Date of death missing